The 1984 Milwaukee Brewers season involved the Brewers' finishing 7th in the American League East with a record of 67 wins and 94 losses.

Offseason 
 December 8, 1983: Ned Yost and Dan Scarpetta (minors) were traded by the Brewers to the Texas Rangers for Jim Sundberg.
 January 16, 1984: Ted Simmons was signed as a free agent with the Brewers.
 January 17, 1984: Don Money was released by the Brewers.
 February 19, 1984: Billy Max (minors) was traded by the Brewers to the New York Mets for Kelvin Moore.

Regular season

Season standings

Record vs. opponents

Notable transactions 
 April 18, 1984: Paul Hartzell was signed as a free agent by the Brewers.
 May 9, 1984: Paul Hartzell was released by the Brewers.
 June 9, 1984: Paul Hartzell was signed as a free agent by the Brewers.
 June 9, 1984: Chuck Hensley was purchased by the Milwaukee Brewers from the Oakland Athletics.
 July 2, 1984: Chuck Hensley was released by the Milwaukee Brewers.
 July 3, 1984: Danny Boone was released by the Brewers.
 August 8, 1984: Jim Kern was signed as a free agent with the Milwaukee Brewers.
 August 11, 1984, Frank Robinson was hired as hitting coach.

Draft picks 
 June 4, 1984: John Jaha was drafted by the Brewers in the 14th round of the 1984 Major League Baseball draft. Player signed September 3, 1984.

Roster

Player stats

Batting

Starters by position 
Note: Pos = Position; G = Games played; AB = At bats; H = Hits; Avg. = Batting average; HR = Home runs; RBI = Runs batted in

Other batters 
Note: G = Games played; AB = At bats; H = Hits; Avg. = Batting average; HR = Home runs; RBI = Runs batted in

Pitching

Starting pitchers 
Note: G = Games pitched; IP = Innings pitched; W = Wins; L = Losses; ERA = Earned run average; SO = Strikeouts

Other pitchers 
Note: G = Games pitched; IP = Innings pitched; W = Wins; L = Losses; ERA = Earned run average; SO = Strikeouts

Relief pitchers 
Note: G = Games pitched; W = Wins; L = Losses; SV = Saves; ERA = Earned run average; SO = Strikeouts

Farm system

The Brewers' farm system consisted of five minor league affiliates in 1984.

Notes

References 
1984 Milwaukee Brewers team at Baseball-Reference
1984 Milwaukee Brewers team page at www.baseball-almanac.com

Milwaukee Brewers seasons
Milwaukee Brewers season
Mil